Year 932 (CMXXXII) was a leap year starting on Sunday (link will display the full calendar) of the Julian calendar.

Events 
 By place 

 Europe 
 Summer – Alberic II leads an uprising at Rome against his stepfather Hugh of Provence, king of Italy, after he is insulted at the wedding of his mother, Marozia. Alberic seizes the Lateran Palace, and Hugh escapes with an escort out of the city. Marozia is captured and put in prison. Alberic takes control of the city and appoints himself as the ruler (princeps) of Rome.
 Doge Orso II Participazio retires voluntarily to a monastery, marking the end of the Participazio dominance of the Venetian dogeship. He is succeeded by Pietro II Candiano, the son and namesake of the earlier doge Pietro I.
 Pietro II and Capodistria make a trade agreement without imperial authorization, the self-proclaimed "Marquis" Wintkar forbids repaying any debts to Venice. Pietro begins an economic blockade of Istrian cities.

 Asia 
 Emir Mardavij ibn Ziyar invades Tabaristan and captures the city of Gorgan. The Daylamite military leader Makan ibn Kaki tries to reclaim his territories, but fails. He seeks refuge among the Samanids and enters the service of their ruler Nasr II. He appoints him as governor of Kirman (modern Iran).

 October 31 – Abbasid caliph al-Muqtadir is killed while fighting against the forces of general Mu'nis al-Muzaffar. Al-Muqtadir's brother al-Qahir is chosen to succeed him.

 By topic 

 Religion 
 Summer – Pope John XI is forced to grant power over Rome to his half-brother Alberic II, who is invested as "Prince and Senator of all Romans". John is to resign himself to spiritual leadership of the Catholic Church.

Births 
 August 28 – Richard I, duke of Normandy (d. 996)
 September 26 – Al-Mu'izz, Fatimid caliph (d. 975)
 Abu Firas al-Hamdani, Arab prince and poet (or 933)
 Miskawayh, Persian philosopher and historian (d. 1030)
 Sancho I (the Fat), king of León (approximate date)

Deaths 
 May 6 – Qian Liu, Chinese warlord and king (b. 852)
 May 18 – Ma Shaohong, general of Later Tang
 June 1 – Thietmar, duke of Saxony 
 June 10 – Dong Zhang, Chinese general
 August 15 – Ma Xisheng, king of Chu (b. 899)
 October 31 – Al-Muqtadir, Abbasid caliph (b. 895)

 Fujiwara no Sadakata, Japanese poet (b. 873)
 Isaac Judaeus, Arab Jewish physician (approximate date)
 Orso II Participazio, doge of Venice
 Reginar II, Frankish nobleman (b. 890)
 Rollo, duke of Normandy (approximate date)

In fiction 
 The film Monty Python and the Holy Grail is set in this year.

References